Queen Jeongsun (1222 – 29 July 1237), of the Gyeongju Kim clan, or known as Queen Gyeongsun and formally called as Queen Mother Sungyeong, was the first and primary wife of Wonjong of Goryeo who became the mother of his successor, Chungnyeol of Goryeo.

Biography

Early life
The future Queen Jeongsun was born in 1222 into the Gyeongju Gim clan as the daughter of Gim Yak-seon (김약선) the Duke Jangik (장익공, 莊翼公). Her mother was Lady Choe (부인 최씨), the eldest daughter of Choe U (최우) who was the second dictator of the Ubong Choe Military regime, made she became the maternal granddaughter of U.

Marriage and death
In 1235, she married Crown Prince Wang Jeong, given the royal title of Worthy Consort Gyeongmok (경목현비, 敬穆賢妃) and became his consort (황자비, 太子妃) not long after his appointment as a Crown Prince. A year later, she gave birth into their eldest son (the future King Chungnyeol) but eventually died only at 15 years old on 29 July 1237 after gave birth to a daughter who believed to died young as no records since then. After her husband ascended the throne, she was given a Posthumous name of Queen Jeongsun (정순왕후, 靜順王后) in 1262 and after their son ascended the throne, King Chungnyeol bestowed the name of Queen Mother Sungyeong (순경태후, 順敬太后) towards his mother in 1274.

In 1310, by the new order (제서, 制書) from Emperor Wuzong of Yuan, Gim was titled as Queen Consort of Goryeo (고려왕비, 高麗王妃) since she was the grandmother of the reign king and was said by Wuzong to be clean and prudent in her behavior, gentle and beautiful in the Dharma, praised her diligence and modesty. Due to this, she became the last queen who received Posthumous names like the other one in the early Goryeo periods.

Tomb
In 1244 (31st year reign of her father-in-law, King Gojong), she was buried in "Gareung tomb" (가릉, 嘉陵) located at Neungnae-ri, Yangdo-myeon, Ganghwa-gun, Incheon-si which becomes one of the Goryeo Royal Tombs located in South Korea. In 1992, it was designated as "Incheon Historic Site no. 370".

Family
Father: Kim Yak-seon (김약선)
Grandfather: Kim Tae-seo (김태서; d. 1257)
Grandmother: Lady Min of Yeoheung Min clan (여흥 민씨)
 Uncle: Kim Gi-son (김기손, 金起孫)
 Uncle: Kim Gyeong-son (김경손(金慶孫; ? - 1251)
 Cousin: Kim Hon (김혼, 金琿)
Mother: Lady Choe of the Ubong Choe clan (우봉 최씨)
Grandfather: Choe U (최우; 1166 – 10 December 1249)
Grandmother: Grand Lady Byeon of the Hadong Jeong clan (변한국대부인 하동 정씨; d. 1231)
 Aunt: Lady Choe of the Ubong Choe clan (우봉 최씨)
 Sibling(s)
 Older brother: Kim Mi (김미, 金敉)
 Sister-in-law: Lady Wang of the Kaeseong Wang clan (개성 왕씨); King Sinjong’s granddaughter 
 Older brother: Kim Wi-hang (김위항)
 Older brother: Kim Pil-yeong (김필영)
Husband: King Wonjong of Goryeo (고려 원종; 1219–1274)
 Issue
Son: King Chungnyeol of Goryeo (고려 충렬왕; 3 April 1236 – 30 July 1308)
Daughter-in-law: Qutugh Kelmysh, Queen Jangmok of the Yuan Borjigin clan (쿠틀룩 켈미쉬 장목왕후 보르지긴씨; 22 July 1259 – 11 June 1297)
 Grandson: Yi Wang, Chungseon of Goryeo (고려 충선왕) (20 October 1275 - 23 June 1325)
 Unnamed granddaughter (공주) (1277 - ?)
 Unnamed grandson (왕자) (1278 - ?)
 Unnamed princess (공주) (1237 - ?)

In popular culture
Portrayed by Choi Da-eun and Bang Joon-su in the 2012 MBC TV Series God of War.

References

External links
Queen Jeongsun on Encykorea .
Queen Jeongsun on Goryeosa .
순경태후 on Doosan Encyclopedia .

13th-century Korean people
1222 births
1237 deaths
Korean queens consort
13th-century Korean women
Royal consorts of the Goryeo Dynasty
Deaths_in_childbirth